Bothwell Anesu Mbuwayesango is a Zimbabwean pediatric surgeon who successfully led an all Zimbabwean team that separated conjoined twins in 2014 during an eight-hour operation at Harare hospital; it was the country's second successful separation, the first was in 1985. The two-month-old male twins were joined at the chest and abdomen (including the liver - which can bleed heavily if cut). In 2021 Mbuwayesango led another successful separation during an eighteen-hour surgery at the same hospital. Mr Mbuwayesango was a Council member of the Medical and Dental Practitioners Council of Zimbabwe. He has published articles in the medical literature.

Research interests
 Gastroschisis
 Obstructive jaundice
 Intussusception
 Minimal access surgery

External video
Separating siamese twins in a low resource hospital

References

Living people
Zimbabwean paediatric surgeons
People from Harare
University of Zimbabwe alumni
Year of birth missing (living people)